Edward Chandler is the name of:
 Edward Chandler (American football) (1925–1999), American football coach
 Edward Barron Chandler (1800–1880), Lieutenant-Governor of New Brunswick
 Edward Chandler (bishop) (c. 1660–1750), Anglican bishop
 Edward Chandler (rower) (1902–?), British rower
 Ed Chandler (1917–2003), baseball pitcher
 Eddy Chandler (1894–1948), American actor